Gevin (also Romanized as Gevīn and Geveyn) is a village in Rudbar Rural District, Ruydar District, Khamir County, Hormozgan Province, Iran. At the 2006 census, its population was 1,021, in 250 families.

References 

Populated places in Khamir County